Andrew John Griffith (born 23 February 1971) is a British politician and former senior media executive who, since 2019, has been the Member of Parliament (MP) for Arundel and South Downs.

A member of the Conservative Party, Griffith was appointed Economic Secretary to the Treasury in October 2022. Previously he served as Parliamentary Under-Secretary of State for Exports from July 2022 until September 2022, and as Director of the Number 10 Policy Unit from February 2022 to July 2022.

Early life and education 
Griffith was born at Bexleyheath, Kent, England. He grew up in Bromley and attended St Marys & St Josephs, a state comprehensive school in Sidcup, before going up to read Law at Nottingham University from 1989 to 1992. He qualified as a chartered accountant in 1996, becoming FCA.

Business career 
Griffith first worked for Rothschild & Co and PwC, before joining Sky in 1999 as a financial analyst. By 2008, he rose to become Sky's chief financial officer, joining the board of directors, and at the time of his appointment was the youngest financial director amongst the FTSE 100. In March 2016 he also took on the role of Sky group chief operating officer. When Comcast acquired Sky in 2018, Griffith earned about £17m from the sale of shares.

He is a Fellow of the Royal Television Society and was co-chairman of its 2017 Cambridge convention.

In April 2014, Griffith joined the board of Just Eat as a senior non-executive director, a post which he held in combination with his full-time role at Sky. In 2017, Just Eat was hit by the several challenges, losing its non-executive chairman to poor health, its chief executive officer stepping down and the Competition and Markets Authority reviewing Just Eat's acquisition of competitor Hungryhouse. During this period, Griffith took on the role of chairman.

Political career

Griffith stood as the Conservative prospective parliamentary candidate for the constituency of Corby in 2001 and 2005 but lost to Labour Party candidates on both occasions.

Griffith is a former chairman of the advisory board at the Centre for Policy Studies think tank.

Boris Johnson used Griffith's £9.5 million townhouse as his leadership election campaign headquarters. In 2019, Griffith stepped down from his roles at Sky and Just Eat to become Johnson's chief business adviser, based at 10 Downing Street, taking on the role in July 2019.

Griffith was elected as MP for Arundel and South Downs at the 2019 general election with a majority of 22,521 votes, succeeding Nick Herbert. He stood down from his role as the Prime Minister's chief business adviser upon being returned to Parliament.

On 17 November 2020, Griffith was appointed by Boris Johnson to be the UK's Net Zero Business Champion, a role designed to support UK businesses to make plans to become net zero by 2050 in the run up to the UN Climate Summit at Glasgow in November 2021. On 10 November 2020, he was appointed as a member of the Public Service Broadcasting Advisory Panel, to provide independent expertise and advice as part of the Government's strategic review of public service broadcasting.

On 17 September 2021, Griffith was appointed Parliamentary Private Secretary to the Prime Minister Boris Johnson, alongside Sarah Dines, in the second Cabinet reshuffle of the second Johnson ministry.

Griffith is the founder of and, until his appointment as Minister, co-chaired with the Lord Rees of Ludlow, Astronomer Royal, the All-Party Parliamentary Group for Dark Skies.

On 3 February 2022, Griffith became Parliamentary Secretary in the Cabinet Office (Minister for Policy) and Director of the Number 10 Policy Unit, following the resignation of Munira Mirza.

On 6 June 2022, after a vote of no confidence in the leadership of Boris Johnson was called, Griffith announced that he would be supporting the Prime Minister.

Griffith was appointed Parliamentary Under-Secretary of State (Minister for Trade) in the Department for International Trade on 8 July 2022.

Mr Griffith was Financial Secretary to the Treasury, working under Chancellor of the Exchequer Kasi Kwarteng, during the financial crisis brought about by the mini budget of the Liz Truss government in September and October 2022. 

Following the fall of the Truss government, Griffith joined the Rishi Sunak government as Economic Secretary to the Treasury.

Personal life
Griffith married Barbara, a volunteer charity worker, in 1997; they have a son and daughter. As a businessman, he resided at Putney, in the London Borough of Wandsworth. Griffith also has a residence in the constituency of Arundel and South Downs since 2010. He divides his time between living there and in London.

His father John, an IT salesman, died of COVID-19.

References

External links 

1971 births
Living people
People from Kent
UK MPs 2019–present
Alumni of the University of Nottingham
Conservative Party (UK) MPs for English constituencies
Parliamentary Private Secretaries to the Prime Minister